The 2022 24 Hours of Daytona (formally the 2022 Rolex 24 at Daytona) was an endurance sports car race sanctioned by the International Motor Sports Association (IMSA). The event was held at Daytona International Speedway combined road course in Daytona Beach, Florida, on January 29–30, 2022. This event was the 60th running of the 24 Hours of Daytona since its inception in 1962, and the first of 12 races across multiple classes in the 2022 IMSA SportsCar Championship, as well as the first of four rounds in the 2022 Michelin Endurance Cup. The #60 Meyer Shank Racing Acura, driven by Tom Blomqvist, Hélio Castroneves, Oliver Jarvis, Simon Pagenaud, took the overall win in one of the most competitive events in race history. The top four overall finishers led for at least 88 laps each. Despite being fourth with around three hours left in the race, a monster stretch from Blomqvist helped his team assume the lead before giving way to Castroneves. Castroneves held off former teammate and two-time champion Ricky Taylor to win his second Rolex 24 in a row. The final margin of 3.028 seconds was the third closest in race history. It was also Meyer Shank Racing's first win in IMSA since 2020.

Entries

The list of entries for the 24-hour race consisted of 61 cars across five classes, the largest field for the 24 Hours of Daytona since the inception of the IMSA SportsCar Championship in 2014. There were seven entries in Daytona Prototype International (DPi), 10 entries in Le Mans Prototype 2 (LMP2), nine entries in LMP3, and 35 entries across both GT Daytona classes, with 12 entered in GTD Pro, and 23 entered in GTD.

After the demise of the GT Le Mans (GTLM) class at the end of the 2021 Season, the International Motor Sports Association replaced the class with an all-pro version of the existing GT Daytona (GTD) class, known as GTD-Pro. The class would run under the same balance of performance restrictions as the existing GTD class, after the two classes had their regulations aligned in August 2021. The aligned Balance of Performance and sporting regulations was a key factor in the record 35 car field, helping to drum up major interest in an all-pro version of an already popular class.

In the Daytona Prototype International class, Chip Ganassi Racing expanded to a two-car full-season Cadillac operation, after just running a single car for 2021. Action Express Racing continued to run an extra car for the race, with Toyota Gazoo Racing driver José María López in place of Meyer-Shank Racing-bound Simon Pagenaud. Mazda Motorsports withdrew after the 2021 season had drawn to a close, leaving only two brands in the class, Cadillac and Acura. This edition of the Daytona is also set to be the final one to include the DPi class before the introduction of LMDh for 2023.

After the demise of GTLM, Corvette Racing and BMW Team RLL moved to the GTD Pro class. The former de-tuned their designed-for-GTLM Chevrolet Corvette C8.R to GT3 specification, whilst the latter entered the class with the brand-new BMW M4 GT3. Both organizations have one full-season team and one extra car for Endurance races.

Roar Before the 24

Motul Pole Award 100 
The Motul Pole Award 100 was held on January 23. It was a qualifying race, awarding qualifying points and determining the starting lineup for the 24 Hours of Daytona.

Results

 The #79 WeatherTech Racing entry received a post-race 50 second time penalty for failure to adhere to mandated tire operational requirements.
 The #97 WeatherTech Racing entry received a post-race 50 second time penalty for failure to adhere to mandated tire operational requirements.
 The #16 Wright Motorsports entry received a post-race 50 second time penalty for failure to adhere to mandated tire operational requirements.

Race

Results
Class winners denoted in bold and with 

 The #18 Era Motorsports entry was demoted to last in the LMP2 class as Kyle Tilley failed to meet minimum drive time for the race.

References

24 Hours of Daytona
Daytona
2022 24 Hours of Daytona
2022 WeatherTech SportsCar Championship season